Take It Home may refer to:

 Take It Home (B.B. King album), 1979, or the title song
 Take It Home (Hot Rize album), 1990
 "Take It Home" (Johnny Ruffo song)
 Take It Home (Tom Cochrane album), 2015